John Paul Christian Menard (born August 21, 1980) is an American semi-retired professional stock car racing driver who  last competed part-time in the NASCAR Camping World Truck Series, driving the No. 66 Toyota Tundra for ThorSport Racing.

Menard competed full-time in the NASCAR Cup Series from 2007 to 2019, driving for Dale Earnhardt Inc., Yates Racing, Richard Petty Motorsports, Richard Childress Racing, and Wood Brothers Racing. He retired from full-time competition after the 2019 season. He has also competed in the NASCAR Xfinity Series in the past, including running part-time with Andy Petree Racing in 2003 and 2004, full-time with DEI in 2005 and 2006, and full-time with Roush Fenway Racing in 2010. He has won 1 Cup Series race (the 2011 Brickyard 400), 3 Xfinity Series races, and 1 ARCA Menards Series race.

He is the son of entrepreneur John Menard Jr., the founder of the Menards chain of home improvement stores.

Racing career

Early career

Menard's racing career began at the age of eight when he won the Briggs Junior Karting Class Championship in his native Eau Claire, Wisconsin. He later won the Briggs Medium Class Champion before working his way up to higher level racing. He began ice racing at the age of 15 and won 10 International Ice Racing Association events in his career. He continues to compete in IIRA events in and around Wisconsin. In the summers he raced legends cars on short tracks in Wisconsin. He borrowed Bryan Reffner's Late Model for a week winning his heat race and placing around fourth in the feature. He decided to build his own late model and raced the car three to four times per week. In an interview with Motorsports Minute, Menard said he chose stock cars over Indy Cars because there was no feeder series for Indy Car in his native Wisconsin.

In 2000, he began racing a limited schedule in the NASCAR Re/Max Challenge Series, finishing 13th in points. During his rookie season in 2001, he earned a pole and victory at Road America in Elkhart Lake, Wisconsin, finishing ninth in points. The 2002 season saw Menard compete in ReMax Challenge (two poles, seventh in points), SCCA Trans-Am (one front-row start, four top-10 finishes), Grand Am Cup (victories at Fontana and Phoenix) and the NASCAR Southwest Tour. He capped his season in the latter series with a last-lap pass of veteran Ken Schrader for the Phoenix victory.

In 2003, Menard joined Andy Petree Racing to compete in NASCAR Cup Series, Busch and Truck Series events while still competing in ARCA. In his first ARCA start at Salem Speedway, he qualified second and finished fourth. Later that year, he started on the pole at Winchester, Indiana, and then scored his first ARCA victory at Talladega Superspeedway. He also had top finishes of ninth in the Busch race at Indianapolis Raceway Park and eighth in the Truck race at the Kansas Speedway.

Dale Earnhardt, Inc. (2004–2008)

In 2004, Menard began the NASCAR Busch Series season driving the No. 33 Chevrolet. Midway through the season, he moved to Dale Earnhardt, Inc. in the No. 11 Chevy. 10 races later, Menard won his first career pole position at Kansas Speedway and finished 23rd in points despite no top-tens and missing seven races. With Dan Stillman as crew chief beginning in 2005, they started out by leading 57 laps at Daytona. Winning the Bud Pole Award at Talladega also had them running up front until getting caught up in a wreck. He got his first top-10 and top-five by placing fifth at the Kentucky Speedway. From there, the team went from 20th to the top-10 in points before finishing in sixth place overall, for the season.

In 2006, driving the No. 15 car part-time for DEI, Menard scored his first top-10 finish in the NASCAR Nextel Cup Series by coming in seventh place at the Golden Corral 500 at Atlanta Motor Speedway. Menard also won his first Busch Series race on June 24 at his home track of the Milwaukee Mile by holding off a late race charge and bump from Cup regular Kevin Harvick. Harvick eventually caused a multi-car wreck attempting to bump him out of the way. Menard finished off 2006 with a sixth-place finish in the standings, tying his best finish in the standings last year (2005). He scored 16 top-10 finishes and 7 top-5 finishes in the Busch Series.

In 2007, Menard ran his first full-time Cup season. He failed to qualify for six races that season, but after DEI's merger with Ginn Racing, the owner's points were transferred from Sterling Marlin's No. 14 car to Menard, who was then locked into the rest of the races. His best finish of 2007 was in the Citizens Bank 400 where he finished 12th. In the Busch Series, he picked up 5 top-5 finishes. After the fall race at Charlotte, in which Menard and Tony Stewart made contact on pit road, a feud between the drivers ensued; Stewart had driven for John Menard in the Indy Racing League's early years.

In 2008, Menard won his first Sprint Cup Series pole at Daytona International Speedway in early July and remained in the top 35 in owner's points for the entire season. At Talladega in the fall, Menard had the best run of his career leading laps and coming home with a strong second-place finish. He also was up front for a good part of the day in the other. He finished up the season with $3,559,130 in earnings and finished 26th in points standings, a career high.

Yates Racing/Richard Petty Motorsports (2009–2010)

For the 2009 season, Menard moved over to the No. 98 Ford Fusion operated by Yates Racing. Menard showed limited improvement in 2009, running in the top 10 many times, only to later have problems. For example, he crashed at Las Vegas Motor Speedway while running very well, and was involved in a wreck with only 40 laps to go, while running 7th. These issues lead to the team being in danger of falling out of the top 35 in points standings for much of the year. Menard's best finishes included two 13th-place finishes in the Aarons 499 at Talladega Superspeedway as well as the Samsung 500 at Texas Motor Speedway, and a 15th-place finish in the Southern 500. At the second Dover race, Menard started 10th and ran in the top 10 for most of the day, only to find his car tighten up near the end of the race and come home 19th. At the end of the 2009 NASCAR Sprint Cup Series, Menard was the only driver to not score a top 10 finish who ran all of the races. Menard ended up finishing 31st in the final point standings.

For the 2010 season, his No. 98 team moved over to Richard Petty Motorsports, due to its merger with Yates Racing. In his first start with RPM he finished 13th in the 2010 Daytona 500. He then went on to have Top 20s at Las Vegas and Fontana. The following race at Atlanta Motor Speedway Menard posted his second highest career Cup series finish with a fifth place showing followed by a few more top 20s. After that, he fell from the Top 12 in points. At Charlotte, he finished eighth after running in the top 10 all race long. Menard also posted another top 10 in the circuit's 19th race at Chicagoland Speedway. At Dover International Speedway in September he ended up with a 7th-place finish. The following week he started from the second position at Kansas. While most publications rated him around 30th in the 2010 preseason, he finished 23rd in points.

In early 2010, Menard drove in the No. 90 Daytona Prototype for Spirit of Daytona Racing in the Rolex 24 hours at Daytona International Speedway. In 2010 he came close to winning the Nationwide Series race at Road America in his hometown of Wisconsin. Menard was running 7th when he was spun out on the final lap by road course specialist Tony Ave. It appeared that Menard was to blame, but footage captured by a fan showed that Owen Kelly was at fault.

Richard Childress Racing (2011–2017)

Menard moved to Richard Childress Racing in 2011, driving the No. 27. On July 31, 2011, Menard won his first and only Sprint Cup race in his 167th start, in the Brickyard 400 at the prestigious Indianapolis Motor Speedway. He did so by making his last pit stop with 36 laps to go. He led late, but with 9 laps to go, he was passed by Jamie McMurray. With four to go, he regained the lead and held off Jeff Gordon, the winner of the inaugural Brickyard 400 in the final laps, having enough fuel to do so. He is the first member of the Menard family to win at Indianapolis, in any event, held at the track. He also joins Trevor Bayne, Regan Smith, David Ragan, and Marcos Ambrose as first-time winners in the 2011 season.

In September 2011 at Richmond, Menard and RCR became the center of controversy when Menard spun in the waning laps. It was believed that his accident was intentional, intended to assist his teammate Kevin Harvick who later won the race against Jeff Gordon who would have won if the caution did not come out.

In 2012, Menard did not perform well. He crashed during the Aaron's 499 at Talladega and went winless for 2012. In 2013, he slightly improved when he was briefly in Chase for the Sprint Cup contention. A blown engine early in the Coke Zero 400 caused him to be knocked out of the Chase with a few races left before the Chase began. In the season-ending Ford EcoBoost 400, Menard's tire exploded upon stopping in his pit box; Menard stated, "About a lap later, they told me I was on fire. I lost my brakes, and the damned wheel blew right off."

In 2014 Menard scored 13 top tens (a career high) and held a chase spot for most of the regular season but two consecutive 18th place finishes at Atlanta and Richmond (final race of the regular season) dropped him out of contention.

Menard won the Nationwide race at Michigan for his first NNS win since 2006 in June 2014. He won after Joey Logano blew a tire with 4 laps to go.

In the 2015 Sprint Unlimited at Daytona, Menard won the pole for the race by drawing. He led the first 7 laps until he was involved in a big wreck, finishing 21st. The race was later won by Matt Kenseth. Menard later finished in the top 5 in Auto Club and in Talladega and got 5 top 10s and 22 top 15s. He made the Chase for the first time in his career mostly because he had only one DNF (a blown engine in Texas), grabbing the final spot by 17 points over Aric Almirola. He was eliminated in the first round, but with Matt Kenseth's two-race suspension, Menard passed him and finished in a career-best of 14th in the standings. Also in August 2015, Menard took the checkers at Road America, holding off Blake Koch and Ryan Blaney for his third Xfinity Series win. Aside from the 2011 Brickyard 400, the win was Menard's biggest of his career, as Menard had grown up a few miles from the track.

In the 2016 Sprint Unlimited, Menard finished in a career best 3rd place, after surviving several big ones.

To start of 2017, Menard survived wrecks in the Daytona 500 and brought home a 5th place finish after a few cars ran out of gas. The next week at Atlanta, he finished 25th. Menard scored his 2nd top 10 of the year in the GEICO 500 at Talladega, finishing 9th. In the Coke Zero 400, Menard ran up front late and came home 3rd, barely behind Ricky Stenhouse Jr. and Clint Bowyer. Menard survived most of the carnage in the Brickyard 400 but crashed in a late big one.

Wood Brothers Racing (2018–2019)
On July 26, 2017, Menard was announced as the replacement for Ryan Blaney in the No. 21 Wood Brothers Racing Ford starting in 2018.

On June 30, 2018, almost 10 years to the day, Menard got his second ever NASCAR Cup Series Pole Award at Chicagoland Speedway for the Overton's 400.

On July 12, 2019, Menard announced he had a contract for the 2020 season, indicating that he plans to stay with Wood Brothers. On September 10, 2019, Menard announced his retirement from full-time racing after the 2019 season.

ThorSport Racing (2021)
On May 17, 2021, Truck Series team ThorSport Racing announced that Menard would return to NASCAR and compete in a fifth part-time truck for the team, the No. 66, in the series' new race at Circuit of the Americas. It is his first NASCAR start in his semi-retirement, and his first Truck Series start since 2007 when he competed in the spring Martinsville race in the No. 51 for Billy Ballew Motorsports.

Personal life
A native of Eau Claire, Wisconsin, Menard is the son of Menards founder John Menard Jr. He attended the University of Wisconsin-Eau Claire, majoring in business. He currently resides in the Charlotte, North Carolina, area with his wife Jennifer. The couple had their first child, a daughter, on March 18, 2014. The family later welcomed another child, a son, in November 2017. Menard is a Roman Catholic and a fan of power metal music. Paul Menard doesn't have any social media and he chooses to stay away from it because "it is nothing good and there's so much more to life than looking at other people's lives behind a screen."

Motorsports career results

NASCAR
(key) (Bold – Pole position awarded by qualifying time. Italics – Pole position earned by points standings or practice time. * – Most laps led.)

Monster Energy Cup Series

Daytona 500

Xfinity Series

Camping World Truck Series

ARCA Re/Max Series
(key) (Bold – Pole position awarded by qualifying time. Italics – Pole position earned by points standings or practice time. * – Most laps led.)

 Season still in progress 
 Ineligible for series points

24 Hours of Daytona Results

References

External links

 
 

Living people
1980 births
Sportspeople from Eau Claire, Wisconsin
Racing drivers from Wisconsin
24 Hours of Daytona drivers
NASCAR drivers
ARCA Menards Series drivers
Trans-Am Series drivers
University of Wisconsin–Eau Claire alumni
Dale Earnhardt Inc. drivers
Robert Yates Racing drivers
Richard Childress Racing drivers
Team Penske drivers
RFK Racing drivers